Azza Attoura is a Syrian female kickboxer. She is a world champion in kickboxing and Muay Thai with seven international awards. She was born on 6 October 1974 in the Syrian city of Hama.

See also
 List of female kickboxers

References

External links
 Azza Attoura at Awakening Fighters

1974 births
Living people
Syrian female kickboxers
Female Muay Thai practitioners
20th-century Syrian women